Let's Be Happy is a Technicolor 1957 British musical film starring Tony Martin, Vera-Ellen and Robert Flemyng and directed by  Henry Levin. It was written by Dorothy Cooper and Diana Morgan in CinemaScope. This film was an updated remake of Jeannie (1941), starring Barbara Mullen, which itself was based on the stage play Jeannie by Aimée Stuart.

The film was Vera-Ellen's final film; she later withdrew from public life after the death of her daughter, Victoria Ellen Rothschild. The film is also Tony Martin's final appearance in a movie musical, although he later made a cameo appearance in Dear Mr. Wonderful, a 1982 film.

Let's Be Happy premiered in London on 9 May 1957.

Plot
Jeannie McLean lives in rural Vermont and inherits some money from her Scottish-born grandfather whom she was looking after in his old age. She decides to travel to Scotland to see her ancestral country. On the journey by air and train, she finds herself continuously sitting near Stanley Smith, a brash washing-machine salesman, whose pushy ways help her through various difficulties.
She finally reaches Edinburgh (during the Festival).

At her hotel, Jeannie is romanced by Lord James MacNairn, an impoverished landowner, who has heard that she has money. When she catches out Stanley in a lie, she breaks off their friendship and accepts James' attentions. Stanley still follows her around, with a pretty French redhead in tow, including taking seats right behind James and Jeannie at the ballet, and inviting them to join them in a restaurant.

James takes Jeannie to see Loch Lomond and to a family wedding and to his family home - a huge castle. However, he is restricted to a very small wing of the castle with his housekeeper Miss Cathie, with the rest of the castle open to the public.

James asks Jeannie to marry him, but when he learns that she has spent all her inheritance, he confesses he originally wanted her for her money but now really does love her. But now knowing that he is also broke, she turns him down. Jeannie returns home to Vermont, but Stanley, having made a major sales coup, tracks her down and proposes to her.

Cast
 Vera-Ellen as Jeannie MacLean (singing voice was dubbed by Joan Small) 
 Tony Martin as Stanley Smith
 Robert Flemyng as Lord James MacNairn 
 Zena Marshall as Helene
 Helen Horton as Sadie Whitelaw
 Beckett Bould as Rev. MacDonald
 Alfred Burke as French Ticket Clerk
 Vernon Greeves as First Air France Steward
 Richard Molinas as Bearded Man
 Eugene Deckers as Diner Car Attendant
 Russell Waters as Hotel Reception Clerk
 Paul Young as Page Boy, Bobby
 Peter Sinclair as MacTavish
 Magda Miller as Mrs. MacTavish
 Brian Oulton as Hotel Valet
 Guy Middleton as Mr. Fielding
 Katherine Kath as Mrs. Fielding
 Charles Carson as Mr. Ferguson, Lawyer
 Jock McKay as Elderly Dancer
 Michael Anthony as Monsieur Fior
 Jameson Clark as MacPhail
 Eric Pohlmann as Customs Official
 Carl Duering as Customs Inspector
 Molly Weir as Flower Girl
 Ewan Roberts as Hotel Porter
 Jean Cadell as Mrs. Cathie
 Gordon Jackson as Dougal MacLean

Production
Location filming took place in Edinburgh and other locations in Scotland, Paris, and Thirlestane Castle which serves as Lord James' country house.

References

External links
 
 

1957 films
British romantic musical films
Films shot at Associated British Studios
1950s English-language films
1957 musical comedy films
Films directed by Henry Levin
British films based on plays
1957 romantic comedy films
British romantic comedy films
1950s romantic musical films
Musical film remakes
1950s British films